Dundee  was a ship wrecked in 1808 off the coast of New South Wales, Australia.

History
Dundee left Sydney for Fiji to obtain Sandalwood to take to China in August 1808. As it sailed past the entrance to the Hunter River the ship encountered a heavy gale and foundered on the sandbars at the mouth of the river. Shortly after the ship broke up drowning two Lascars. The remaining crew made it to shore, although the chief mate gave up swimming in a state of exhaustion and was only rescued when other sailors went back into the surf to rescue him.

References

Shipwrecks of the Hunter Region
Sail ships of Australia
Individual sailing vessels
History of Newcastle, New South Wales
Maritime incidents in 1808
1808 in Australia
1788–1850 ships of Australia
Merchant ships of Australia
1800s ships